The Epigraphy Museum of Tripoli is a museum located in Tripoli, Libya.

References

See also 

 List of museums in Libya

Museums with year of establishment missing
Historiography
History museums
Inscriptions
Museums in Tripoli, Libya